Rhagastis binoculata is a moth of the family Sphingidae. It is known from Taiwan.

The wingspan is 54–63 mm. It is very similar to Rhagastis albomarginatus dichroae and distinguishable only by the pinkish-grey oval patch across the postmedian lines on the forewing upperside. The forewing upperside is also very similar to Rhagastis albomarginatus, but the conspicuous oval pale patch that divides the postmedian lines is pinkish grey. The hindwing underside has a small black discal spot.

Larvae have been recorded feeding on Hydrangea chinensis.

References

Rhagastis
Moths described in 1909